There are many modes of mechanical ventilation. In medicine, mechanical ventilation is a method to mechanically assist or replace spontaneous breathing.

A breath by breath trigger, limit, cycling (TLC) classification of the common modes of ventilation. (V = ventilator; P = patient)

See also
Respiratory therapy

References

Respiratory therapy
Mechanical ventilation
Pulmonology